Gonzalo Mejía Airport  is an airport  southwest of the city of Turbo, in the Antioquia Department of Colombia. The airport is on a small wooded peninsula running south from the city. As almost a quarter of its runway has been completely eroded by the sea, there are currently no fixed-wing operations at the airport.

The Turbo non-directional beacon (Ident: TUR) is located just east of the field.

See also

Transport in Colombia
List of airports in Colombia

References

External links
OpenStreetMap - Gonzalo Mejía
OurAirports - Gonzalo Mejía
Gonzalo Mejía Airport

Airports in Colombia